The Bogotá Bulldogs is an Australian rules football club based in Bogotá, Colombia. The team trains and plays at an altitude of 2600m, making for extremely trying conditions for any visiting opposition. The Bulldogs played against the Santiago Saints on September 3, 2016, in the first ever international Australian rules football game in South America where they were victorious 98 to 48, claiming the AFL Andes Cup.

References

External links 
 

Australian rules football in the Americas
Sport in Bogotá
Australian rules football clubs